Jean Testu de Mauroy (1626, Paris – April 1706, Paris) was a French clergyman and academic. He was the member elected to occupy seat 4 of the Académie française in 1688.

References 
 

1626 births
1706 deaths
Writers from Paris
17th-century French writers
17th-century French male writers
Members of the Académie Française